Dr. Bibi Ameenah Firdaus Gurib-Fakim GCSK (born 17 October 1959) is a Mauritian politician and biodiversity scientist who served as the sixth president of Mauritius from 2015 to 2018. In December 2014, she was selected to be the presidential candidate of the Alliance Lepep. After Kailash Purryag resigned on 29 May 2015, both Prime Minister Sir Anerood Jugnauth and Leader of the Opposition Paul Berenger positively welcomed her nomination, which was unanimously approved in a vote in the National Assembly.

Gurib-Fakim is the first woman elected as president of the country and is the third woman to have served as Head of State following Queen Elizabeth II and Monique Ohsan Bellepeau, who preceded her in this office and was her first Vice President. She served as a 2019 keynote speaker of Cambridge University's conference "Africa Together: Which Way Forward?" hosted by the African Society of Cambridge University.

Early life and education 

Bibi Ameenah Firdaus Gurib-Fakim was born in the village of Surinam on 17 October 1959, to parents Hassenjee Gurib and Firdaus Durgauhee. She grew up in Plaine Magnien and completed her studies at the primary school in Saint-Patrice. She then moved to Mahébourg Loreto Convent, finishing her Higher School Certificate at Loreto convent Quatre Bornes before flying to England for her undergraduate degree in chemistry. She graduated from the University of Surrey in 1983 with a BSc degree in chemistry. After obtaining her PhD degree in organic chemistry at Exeter University, she returned home in 1987 to take employment at the University of Mauritius.

Career

She worked as Managing Director of CIDP Research & Innovation (formerly Cephyr, Centre for Phytotherapy Research). Previously, she was a Professor with  a personal chair in Organic Chemistry at the University of Mauritius (2001) and where she served successively as Dean of the Faculty of Science and Pro–Vice Chancellor (2004–2010). She also worked at the Mauritius Research Council as Manager for Research (1995–1997). She served as the Chairperson the International Council for Scientific Union – Regional Office for Africa (2011–2014).
In 2015, her nomination for the Presidency of Mauritius, put forward by then-PM and fellow Militant Socialist Movement member Anerood Jugnauth, was unanimously approved by the Mauritian National Assembly.
She resigned in 2018 amid a financial scandal during the prime ministership of Pravind Jugnauth. The office of president remained vacant until December 2019, when Prithvirajsing Roopun took office. In the meantime, Vice President Barlen Vyapoory functioned as acting president.

Vice-chancellor appointment

In December 2013 Gurib-Fakim made a complaint to the Mauritian Equal Opportunities Commission (EOC) alleging religious discrimination in the consideration of her application for Vice Chancellor of the University of Mauritius (UoM). The EOC investigation found that this was not the case, but noted shortcomings in the selection process. The report cited the lack of clear criteria and mark sheets for evaluating candidates. Similarly, the last word went to Professor Jugessur, then president of the Council of the UoM if tiebreak.

Gurib-Fakim eventually left her position as Professor at the University to open her own science centre known as CIDP Research & Innovation where she is the Managing Director.

Personal life

In 1988, she married Dr. Anwar Fakim who is a surgeon. They have two children; a son (Adam, born in 1992 and studied at the University of Kent) and a daughter (Imaan, who studied Computer Science).

Controversies
Soon after her appointment as President the former Prime Minister Navin Ramgoolam raised concerns about the PhD qualifications of Ameenah Gurib-Fakim. Ramgoolam reiterated his earlier concerns when the Platinum Card Scandal came to light.

Ameenah Gurib-Fakim officially resigned from the position of President of Mauritius on 23 March 2018 after the 50th anniversary of independence celebrations when L'Express newspapers leaked her bank details, although she had refunded the expenditures one year prior to the leak. This resignation was mainly due to conflicts on interest and allegations arising from her involvement as Vice-Chairperson of the Charitable Organisation Planet Earth Institute (PEI), private expenditures on a credit card  and business trips financed by PEI and approved by the Govt. of Mauritius, given the involvement of PEI's controversial founder and businessman Álvaro Sobrinho. Ameenah Gurib Fakim also requested that the Financial Services Commission (FSC) issue a banking license to Álvaro Sobrinho, as Chairperson of PEI to host the PASET Funds.

In June 2018 the Government of Mauritius instigated a Commission of Inquiry on violation of the Constitution and other laws by former President Ameenah Gurib-Fakim, led by Judge Asraf Ally Caunhye. Before resigning from office in 2018, and without consulting the Cabinet of Mauritius, Ameenah Gurib-Fakim had nominated Sir Hamid Moollan to preside an ill-fated Commission of Inquiry on Álvaro Sobrinho's activities. Despite numerous hearings over a period of nearly 3 years the inquiry has not been completed.

Honours and awards

Honours

National honours

 
 Commander of the Order of the Star and Key of the Indian Ocean
 Grand Cross of the Order of the Star and Key of the Indian Ocean

Foreign honours

 : Member of the Order of Academic Palms, 3rd Class (national order)
  Castroan Royal Family of Two Sicilies: Knight Grand Cross of the Royal Order of Francis I (dynastic order)

Awards

Gurib-Fakim has also been the recipient of various international awards including the L'Oréal-UNESCO Award for Women in Science (2007), Laureate for the National Economic and Social Council (2007), the CTA / NEPAD / AGRA / RUFORUM for ‘African Women in Science’ and the African Union Award for Women in Science. She was also made Commander of the Order of the Star and Key of the Indian Ocean (CSK) by President Anerood Jugnauth in 2008 for her contribution in the education and the scientific sector. She was awarded the Order of the ‘Chevalier de l’Ordre des Palmes Academiques’ by the Government of France in 2009. Upon becoming President, she was automatically elevated to the highest civilian award of Grand Commander of the Star and Key of the Indian Ocean (GSCK).

National awards

 : Laureate for the National Economic and Social Council

Foreign and international awards

 African Union: African Union Award for 'Women in Science' (2009)
 African Union: Laureate for the CTA/NEPAD/AGRA/RUFORUM for 'African Women in Science' (2009)
 : Honorary Degree of the Pierre and Marie Curie University
 : Fellow of the Jordanian Islamic Academy of Science
 : Fellow of the African Institute of Science and Technology
 : Laureate of the L'Oréal-UNESCO Award for Women in Science for Africa
 : Elected Fellow of the Linnean Society of London (2007)

Bibliography

Academic works

Popular publications

 Plantes médicinales de l'Île Rodrigues (1994)
 Plantes médicinales de Maurice (1995)
 Natural toxins and poisonous plants of Mauritius (1999)
 Maurice par les plantes médicinales (2002)
 Mauritius through its medicinal plants (2002)
 Molecular and therapeutic aspects of redox biochemistry (2004)
 An illustrated guide to the flora of Mauritius and the Indian Ocean Islands (2003)
 Medicinal Plants of the Indian Ocean Islands (2004)
 Guide illustré de la flore de Maurice et des îles de l'Océan Indien (2004)
 Biodiversity towards drugs development (2005)
 Booklet on 'Medicinal Plants at the state House, Le Réduit' (2005)
 Lesser-known and under-utilised plant resources (2005)
 Ressources végétales méconnues et sous-utilisées (2005)
 Guide illustré de la flore de Maurice et des îles de l’Océan Indien (2006)
 Medicinal Plants of Mauritius and of the World (2007, 2011)
 Plantes médicinales de Maurice et d’ailleurs (2007, 2011)
 Plantes d’hier et médicaments d’aujourd’hui (2008)
 Mieux connaître les arbres et arbrisseaux de Maurice et des îles de l'Océan Indien(2008)
 Towards a better understanding of Trees and Shrubs of Mauritius and the Indian Ocean Islands (2009)
 African Herbal Pharmacopoeia (2010)
 Guide des plantes tropicales de l'Île Maurice et de La Réunion (2011)
 Trees of the World (2013)

See also 

 President of Mauritius
 List of presidents of Mauritius

References

Further reading

 

1959 births
21st-century women politicians
21st-century women scientists
Alumni of the University of Exeter
Alumni of the University of Surrey
Chevaliers of the Ordre des Palmes Académiques
Female heads of state
Grand Commanders of the Order of the Star and Key of the Indian Ocean
L'Oréal-UNESCO Awards for Women in Science laureates
Living people
Mauritian politicians of Indian descent
Mauritian scientists
Pierre and Marie Curie University alumni
Presidents of Mauritius
Women presidents
Women chemists
Mauritian Muslims
Fellows of the African Academy of Sciences